The 2007–08 Iowa State Cyclones men's basketball team represents Iowa State University during the 2007–08 NCAA Division I men's basketball season. The Cyclones were coached by Greg McDermott, who was in his 2nd season. They played their home games at Hilton Coliseum in Ames, Iowa and competed in the Big 12 Conference.

Previous season

The Cyclones finished 15-16, 6-10 in Big 12 play to finish 10th the regular season conference standings.  They lost to Oklahoma in the first round of the Big 12 tournament.

Offseason departures

Recruiting

Roster

Schedule and results

|-
!colspan=12 style=""|Exhibition
|-

|-
!colspan=12 style=""|Regular Season
|-

|-

|-

|-

|-

|-

|-

|-

|-

|-

|-

|-

|-

|-

|-

|-

|-

|-

|-

|-

|-

|-

|-

|-

|-

|-

|-

|-

|-

|-

|-

|-
!colspan=12 style=""|Big 12 Tournament
|-

|-

Awards and honors

All-Conference Selections

Jiri Hubalek (3rd Team)
Wesley Johnson (Honorable Mention)

Ralph A. Olsen Award

Rahshon Clark (2008)

References

Iowa State Cyclones men's basketball seasons
Iowa State
Iowa State Cyc
Iowa State Cyc